The Wisconsin Badgers women's hockey team will represent the University of Wisconsin in the 2011–12 NCAA Division I women's ice hockey season. The Badgers failed to repeat as NCAA women's Frozen Four champions.

Offseason
 September 1: The Badgers women's ice hockey team will take part in the opening game festivities for the 2011 Wisconsin Badgers football team. The women's team will be at Badgerville, the official pre-game event of Wisconsin Athletics. Players will be at the event with their NCAA Frozen Four national championship trophy for photos and autographs.
 September 1: 2011 Patty Kazmaier Memorial Award winner and former Badgers player Meghan Duggan is a finalist for the 2011 Sportswoman of the Year Award, presented by the Women's Sports Foundation

Recruiting

Regular season

News and notes
 Sept. 20: Wisconsin head coach Mark Johnson was named one of four recipients of the 2011 Lester Patrick Trophy for outstanding service to hockey in the United States.
 September 24: Karley Sylvester was the first freshman of the campaign to net a goal.
 On September 25, 2011, Hilary Knight scored her fifth career hat trick in a 13-0 defeat of the Lindenwood Lions. In addition, Briana Decker scored her third career hat trick. The 13 goals scored by the Badgers were tied for third most in the NCAA women's ice hockey all-time list for most goals scored in a game by a team.
Nov. 18-19: Carolyne Prevost became the 17th player in program history to record 100 career points. In a victory over RPI, she netted the first goal of the game for Wisconsin. She would also record an assist in the match. The following day, Prevost recorded six points in the finale against RPI. It was a team-high for any Wisconsin skater this season. She scored two goals, including the game winner, and helped on four other goals to establish a new career high for most points in one game.
Nov. 19: Brianna Decker recorded her sixth career hat trick as the Badgers celebrated an 8-2 victory against RPI. In addition, she extended her point scoring streak to 24 games.
November 25: In Wisconsin’s fifth shutout of the season, Brianna Decker and Hilary Knight netted two goals apiece in a 5-0 victory over St. Cloud State. Brianna Decker extended her point scoring streak to 26 games, a program record, while Alex Rigsby earned her 10th career shutout.
December 10: In a WCHA contest versus Bemidji State, Hilary Knight produced four points, giving her a career total of 239. She has now surpassed Meghan Duggan’s 238 career points, to become the Wisconsin Badgers all-time leading point scorer. For her efforts, Knight was recognized as the WCHA Player of the Week.
January 27–28: Wisconsin posted a two-game sweep of Bemidji State. In the first game, Madison Packer scored the game-winning goal in overtime as the Badgers prevailed by a 3-2 score. The following day, Hilary Knight notched her first goal since Dec. 10 with 7:38 left in the third period. Said goal would stand as the game winner on Fill the Bowl nights. A record crowd of 12,402 attended the Kohl Center. Alex Rigby made 28 saves to obtain her sixth shutout of the campaign. Her rival between the pipes, Bemidji State netminder Zuzana Tomcikova made 32 saves. Wisconsin is the only team to sweep the season series from the Beavers during the 2011-12 season. The previous record for most fans to watch a women's college hockey game at the Kohl Center was 10,668. That record was set at the Kohl Center on Jan. 29, 2011.

Standings

Schedule and results
  Green background indicates win (3 points).
  Yellow background indicates shootout win (2 points).
  Red background indicates loss (0 points).
  White background indicates tie (1 point).

Awards and honors
Brooke Ammerman, WCHA Co-Offensive Player of the Week (Week of February 22, 2012)
Brianna Decker, 2012 Patty Kazmaier Memorial Award
Katy Josephs, WCHA Rookie of the Week (Week of November 28, 2011)
Hilary Knight, WCHA Player of the Week (Week of December 14, 2011)
Carolyne Prevost, WCHA Co-Offensive Player of the Week (Week of November 21, 2011)
Carolyne Prevost, WCHA Player of the Week (Week of January 17, 2012)
 Alex Rigsby, WCHA Defensive Player of the Week (Week of October 18, 2011)
 Alex Rigsby, WCHA Defensive Player of the Week (Week of October 25, 2011)
Alex Rigsby, WCHA Defensive Player of the Week (Week of February 1, 2012)
 Blayre Turnbull, WCHA Rookie of the Week (Week of October 5, 2011)

See also
 2011-12 Wisconsin Badgers men's ice hockey season

References

Wisconsin
Wisconsin Badgers women's ice hockey seasons
NCAA women's ice hockey Frozen Four seasons
Wiscon
Wiscon